Nathan Mayer Shapiro (June 2, 1919 – December 2, 2005) was an American visual artist.

Art

Nat Mayer Shapiro’s art is best known for his complex paintings on paper and canvas that may incorporate structural and whimsical imagery among areas of pure or constructed abstraction.  He did not adhere to any particular school or art movement, remaining an individualist throughout his life.

Life

Nat Mayer Shapiro was born in New York City, and spent his childhood and adolescence in Brooklyn, NY.  At ten, he decided he would become a full-time fine arts painter and started attending the after-school programs at the Pratt Institute in New York.  He was inducted in the army in 1941, and traveled with the Medical Corp to Australia and New Guinea where he spent most of his four years and half of military life.  Upon his return to the States, he spent eight months in the Rest & Rehabilitation Center in Lake Placid, NY, where he was finally able to work as an artist, painting stage sets, portraits and landscapes.  In 1945, the War Department acquired some of Shapiro’s artwork for the then planned War Museum.  Back into civilian life, Shapiro worked as a commercial artist while attending classes at the Art Students League of New York.

In 1951, married and father of two children, he moved with his family to Chicago.  In 1961, they moved to France.  In Paris, he attended the Académie de la Grande Chaumière and experimented with different artistic media and styles.

In 1985, Shapiro returned to New York and settled in Yonkers, New York where he joined a group of artists who wanted to open a cooperative art gallery.  He was instrumental in locating, setting up and launching Westchester's oldest fine arts cooperative gallery in Dobbs Ferry, the Upstream Gallery of which he was president from 1995 to 2002. He died in New York City.

Collections

Nat Mayer Shapiro’s works of art can be found in numerous private art collections throughout the world, and are included in the permanent art collections of the Ministry of Culture (Fonds National d'Art Contemporain—FNAC), Paris, France, The Art Gallery of the Queensborough Community College, Queens, NY and Pfizer Inc. New York, New York.  He is represented by Galerie Saphir in Paris and Dinard, France.

External links
TV show about Shapiro exhibit (in French)
Shapiro exhibit at Galerie Saphir, Paris, 2018
Dinard exhibit press, 2018 (in French)
Shapiro on Artnet
Online gallery of Nat Shapiro
Shapiro at QCC Gallery, Queens, New York, 2017
Shapiro at Yoho artist's building
Shapiro at Blue Door Art Center, 2015
ART; Recognition for Regional Artists (The New York Times, January 31, 1999)
Shapiro at Fonds National d'Art Contemporain

20th-century American painters
American male painters
21st-century American painters
Jewish American artists
1919 births
2005 deaths
Jewish painters
Art Students League of New York alumni
Alumni of the Académie de la Grande Chaumière
20th-century American Jews
21st-century American Jews
20th-century American male artists